William True Boardman (April 21, 1882 – September 28, 1918) was an American film actor of the silent era. He appeared in more than 130 films between 1911 and 1919 before falling victim to the 1918 flu pandemic.

Biography

True Boardman was born in Oakland, California, the son of William T. Boardman (1859 - 1886) and Bay Area actress Caro True Boardman, and died at the age of 36 in Los Angeles, California.  True Boardman began performing on stage in 1900 in Oakland and later spent some time doing theater work in Seattle before embarking on his film career.

He was the husband of actress Virginia True Boardman (Margaret Shields) and the father of True Eames Boardman (1909–2003), who had a long career as a script writer for radio, film and television. As a boy True Eames Boardman had appeared in a number of films, including some starring Charlie Chaplin and Mary Pickford.

Boardman was the great-grandfather of actress Lisa Gerritsen.

Partial filmography
 The Reward for Broncho Billy (1912) - The Sheriff
 The Hazards of Helen (1914)
 Mysteries of the Grand Hotel (1915) - Jack Hilton - Frances' Assistant [Ch. 3–8, 11]
 The Pitfall (1915) - Clive Westcott - District Attorney
 Stingaree (1915) - Irving 'Stingaree' Randolph
 The Social Pirates (1916)
 The Girl from Frisco (1916) - Congressman John Wallace
 The Further Adventures of Stingaree (1916) - Irving Randolph / Stingaree
 Tarzan of the Apes (1918) - John Clayton - Lord Greystoke
 The Doctor and the Woman (1918) - 'K'
 Danger Within (1918) - Gilbert Bolton
 The Romance of Tarzan (1918) - Lord Greystoke
 Terror of the Range (1919) - Broncho Haryigan

References

External links

Grave of True Boardman

1882 births
1918 deaths
Male actors from California
Deaths from Spanish flu
American male film actors
American male silent film actors
20th-century American male actors
Burials at Forest Lawn Memorial Park (Glendale)